Senator Shearer may refer to:

Conrad Shearer (1873–1948), Wisconsin State Senate
Mark Shearer (born 1952), Iowa State Senate